Heart inflammation may refer to:

 Endocarditis, inflammation of the endocardium
 Myocarditis
 Pericarditis, inflammation of the pericardium